Flerovium (114Fl) is a synthetic element, and thus a standard atomic weight cannot be given. Like all synthetic elements, it has no stable isotopes. The first isotope to be synthesized was 289Fl in 1999 (or possibly 1998). Flerovium has seven known isotopes, and possibly 2 nuclear isomers. The longest-lived isotope is 289Fl with a half-life of 1.9 seconds, but the unconfirmed 290Fl may have a longer half-life of 19 seconds.

List of isotopes 

|-
| 284Fl
| style="text-align:right" | 114
| style="text-align:right" | 170
| 
| 3.1(13) ms
| SF
| (various)
| 0+
|-
| 285Fl
| style="text-align:right" | 114
| style="text-align:right" | 171
| 285.18364(47)#
| 
| α
| 281Cn
| 3/2+#
|-
| rowspan=2|286Fl
| rowspan=2 style="text-align:right" | 114
| rowspan=2 style="text-align:right" | 172
| rowspan=2|286.18424(71)#
| rowspan=2|
| α (55%)
| 282Cn
| rowspan=2|0+
|-
| SF (45%)
| (various)
|-
| rowspan=2| 287Fl
| rowspan=2 style="text-align:right" | 114
| rowspan=2 style="text-align:right" | 173
| rowspan=2| 287.18678(66)#
| rowspan=2| 
| α
| 283Cn
| rowspan=2|
|-
| EC?
| 287Nh
|-
| 288Fl
| style="text-align:right" | 114
| style="text-align:right" | 174
| 288.18757(91)#
| 653(113) ms
| α
| 284Cn
| 0+
|-
| 289Fl
| style="text-align:right" | 114
| style="text-align:right" | 175
| 289.19042(60)#
| 2.1(6) s
| α
| 285Cn
| 5/2+#
|-
| rowspan=2 | 290Fl
| rowspan=2 style="text-align:right" | 114
| rowspan=2 style="text-align:right" | 176
| rowspan=2 |
| rowspan=2 | 19 s?
| EC
| 290Nh
| rowspan=2 | 0+
|-
| α
| 286Cn

 It is theorized that 298Fl will have a relatively long half-life, as N = 184 is expected to correspond to a closed neutron shell.

Isotopes and nuclear properties

Nucleosynthesis

Target-projectile combinations leading to Z=114 compound nuclei
The below table contains various combinations of targets and projectiles which could be used to form compound nuclei with an atomic number of 114.

Cold fusion
This section deals with the synthesis of nuclei of flerovium by so-called "cold" fusion reactions. These are processes which create compound nuclei at low excitation energy (~10–20 MeV, hence "cold"), leading to a higher probability of survival from fission. The excited nucleus then decays to the ground state via the emission of one or two neutrons only.

208Pb(76Ge,xn)284−xFl
The first attempt to synthesise flerovium in cold fusion reactions was performed at Grand accélérateur national d'ions lourds (GANIL), France in 2003. No atoms were detected, providing a yield limit of 1.2 pb. The team at RIKEN have indicated plans to study this reaction.

Hot fusion
This section deals with the synthesis of nuclei of flerovium by so-called "hot" fusion reactions. These are processes which create compound nuclei at high excitation energy (~40–50 MeV, hence "hot"), leading to a reduced probability of survival from fission. The excited nucleus then decays to the ground state via the emission of 3–5 neutrons. Fusion reactions utilizing 48Ca nuclei usually produce compound nuclei with intermediate excitation energies (~30–35 MeV) and are sometimes referred to as "warm" fusion reactions. This leads, in part, to relatively high yields from these reactions.

248Cm(40Ar,xn)288-xFl
One of the first attempts at synthesis of superheavy elements was performed by Albert Ghiorso et al. and Stan Thompson et al. in 1968 at the Lawrence Berkeley National Laboratory using this reaction. No events attributable to superheavy nuclei were identified; this was expected as the compound nucleus 288Fl (with N = 174) falls ten neutrons short of the closed shell predicted at N = 184. This first unsuccessful synthesis attempt provided early indications of cross-section and half-life limits for superheavy nuclei producible in hot fusion reactions.

244Pu(48Ca,xn)292−xFl (x=2,3,4,5)
The first experiments on the synthesis of flerovium were performed by the team in Dubna in November 1998. The reaction was repeated in 1999 and a further two atoms of flerovium were detected. The team further studied the reaction in 2002. In an attempt to study the chemistry of copernicium as the isotope , this reaction was repeated in April 2007. Surprisingly, a PSI-FLNR directly detected two atoms of  forming the basis for the first chemical studies of flerovium.

In June 2008, the experiment was repeated in order to further assess the chemistry of the element using the  isotope. A single atom was detected seeming to confirm the noble-gas-like properties of the element.

During May–July 2009, the team at GSI studied this reaction for the first time, as a first step towards the synthesis of tennessine.

242Pu(48Ca,xn)290−xFl (x=2,3,4,5)
The team at Dubna first studied this reaction in March–April 1999 and detected two atoms of flerovium, assigned to 287Fl. The reaction was repeated in September 2003 in order to attempt to confirm the decay data for 287Fl and 283Cn since conflicting data for 283Cn had been collected (see copernicium). The Russian scientists were able to measure decay data for 288Fl, 287Fl and the new isotope 286Fl from the measurement of the 2n, 3n, and 4n excitation functions.

In April 2006, a PSI-FLNR collaboration used the reaction to determine the first chemical properties of copernicium by producing 283Cn as an overshoot product. In a confirmatory experiment in April 2007, the team were able to detect 287Fl directly and therefore measure some initial data on the atomic chemical properties of flerovium.

The team at Berkeley, using the Berkeley gas-filled separator (BGS), continued their studies using newly acquired  targets by attempting the synthesis of flerovium in January 2009 using the above reaction.

In April 2009, the collaboration of Paul Scherrer Institute (PSI) and Flerov Laboratory of Nuclear Reactions (FLNR) of JINR carried out another study of the chemistry of flerovium using this reaction. A single atom of 283Cn was detected.

In December 2010, the team at the LBNL announced the synthesis of a single atom of the new isotope 285Fl with the consequent observation of 5 new isotopes of daughter elements.

239,240Pu(48Ca,xn)287,288−xFl (x=3 for 239Pu; x=3, 4 for 240Pu)
The FLNR had plans to study light isotopes of flerovium, formed in the reaction between 239Pu or 240Pu and 48Ca: in particular, the decay products of 283Fl and 284Fl were expected to fill in the gap between the isotopes of the lighter superheavy elements formed by cold fusion with 208Pb and 209Bi targets and those formed by hot fusion with 48Ca projectiles. These reactions were studied in 2015. One new isotope was found in both the 240Pu(48Ca,4n) and 239Pu(48Ca,3n) reactions, the rapidly spontaneously fissioning 284Fl, giving a clear demarcation of the neutron-poor edge of the island of stability. Three atoms of 285Fl were also produced. The Dubna team repeated their investigation of the 240Pu+48Ca reaction in 2017, observing three new consistent decay chains of 285Fl, an additional decay chain from this nuclide that may pass through some isomeric states in its daughters, a chain that could be assigned to 287Fl (likely stemming from 242Pu impurities in the target), and some spontaneous fission events of which some could be from 284Fl, though other interpretations including side reactions involving the evaporation of charged particles are also possible.

As a decay product
The isotopes of flerovium have also been observed in the decay chains of livermorium and oganesson.

Retracted isotopes

285Fl
In the claimed synthesis of 293Og in 1999, the isotope 285Fl was identified as decaying by 11.35 MeV alpha emission with a half-life of 0.58 ms. The claim was retracted in 2001. This isotope was finally created in 2010 and its decay properties supported the fabrication of the previously published decay data.

Chronology of isotope discovery

Fission of compound nuclei with an atomic number of 114
Several experiments have been performed between 2000 and 2004 at the Flerov Laboratory of Nuclear Reactions in Dubna studying the fission characteristics of the compound nucleus 292Fl. The nuclear reaction used is 244Pu+48Ca. The results have revealed how nuclei such as this fission predominantly by expelling closed shell nuclei such as 132Sn (Z=50, N=82). It was also found that the yield for the fusion-fission pathway was similar between 48Ca and 58Fe projectiles, indicating a possible future use of 58Fe projectiles in superheavy element formation.

Nuclear isomerism

289Fl
In the first claimed synthesis of flerovium, an isotope assigned as 289Fl decayed by emitting a 9.71 MeV alpha particle with a lifetime of 30 seconds. This activity was not observed in repetitions of the direct synthesis of this isotope. However, in a single case from the synthesis of 293Lv, a decay chain was measured starting with the emission of a 9.63 MeV alpha particle with a lifetime of 2.7 minutes. All subsequent decays were very similar to that observed from 289Fl, presuming that the parent decay was missed. This strongly suggests that the activity should be assigned to an isomeric level. The absence of the activity in recent experiments indicates that the yield of the isomer is ~20% compared to the supposed ground state and that the observation in the first experiment was a fortunate (or not as the case history indicates). Further research is required to resolve these issues.

It is possible that these decays are due to 290Fl, as the beam energies in these early experiments were set quite low, low enough to make the 2n channel plausible. This assignment necessitates the postulation of undetected electron capture to 290Nh, because it would otherwise be difficult to explain the long half-lives of the daughters of 290Fl to spontaneous fission if they are all even-even. This would suggest that the erstwhile isomeric 289mFl, 285mCn, 281mDs, and 277mHs are thus actually 290Nh (electron capture of 290Fl having been missed, as current detectors are not sensitive to this decay mode), 286Rg, 282Mt, and the spontaneously fissioning 278Bh, creating some of the most neutron-rich superheavy isotopes known to date: this fits well with the systematic trend of increasing half-life as neutrons are added to superheavy nuclei towards the beta-stability line, which this chain would then terminate very close to. The livermorium parent could then be assigned to 294Lv, which would have the highest neutron number (178) of all known nuclei, but all these assignments need further confirmation through experiments aimed at reaching the 2n channel in the 244Pu+48Ca and 248Cm+48Ca reactions.

287Fl
In a manner similar to those for 289Fl, first experiments with a 242Pu target identified an isotope 287Fl decaying by emission of a 10.29 MeV alpha particle with a lifetime of 5.5 seconds. The daughter spontaneously fissioned with a lifetime in accord with the previous synthesis of 283Cn. Both these activities have not been observed since (see copernicium). However, the correlation suggests that the results are not random and are possible due to the formation of isomers whose yield is obviously dependent on production methods. Further research is required to unravel these discrepancies. It is also possible that this activity is due to the electron capture of a 287Fl residue and actually stems from 287Nh and its daughter 283Rg.

Yields of isotopes
The tables below provide cross-sections and excitation energies for fusion reactions producing flerovium isotopes directly. Data in bold represent maxima derived from excitation function measurements. + represents an observed exit channel.

Cold fusion

Hot fusion

Theoretical calculations

Evaporation residue cross sections
The below table contains various targets-projectile combinations for which calculations have provided estimates for cross section yields from various neutron evaporation channels. The channel with the highest expected yield is given.

MD = multi-dimensional; DNS = Dinuclear system; σ = cross section

Decay characteristics
Theoretical estimation of the alpha decay half-lives of the isotopes of the flerovium supports the experimental data.
The fission-survived isotope 298Fl is predicted to have alpha decay half-life around 17 days.

In search for the island of stability: 298Fl

According to macroscopic-microscopic (MM) theory, Z = 114 might be the next spherical magic number. In the region of Z = 114, MM theory indicates that N = 184 is the next spherical neutron magic number and puts forward the nucleus 298Fl as a strong candidate for the next spherical doubly magic nucleus, after 208Pb (Z = 82, N = 126). 298Fl is taken to be at the center of a hypothetical "island of stability" comprising longer-lived superheavy nuclei. However, other calculations using relativistic mean field (RMF) theory propose Z = 120, 122, and 126 as alternative proton magic numbers, depending upon the chosen set of parameters, and some entirely omit Z = 114 or N = 184. It is also possible that rather than a peak at a specific proton shell, there exists a plateau of proton shell effects from Z = 114–126.

The island of stability near 298Fl is predicted to enhance stability for its constituent nuclei, especially against spontaneous fission as a consequence of greater fission barrier heights near the shell closure. Due to the expected high fission barriers, any nucleus within this island of stability will exclusively decay by alpha emission, and as such, the nucleus with the longest half-life may be 298Fl; predictions for the half-life of this nucleus range from minutes to billions of years. It may be possible, however, that the longest living nucleus is not 298Fl, but rather 297Fl (with N = 183) has a longer half-life due to the unpaired neutron. Other calculations suggest that stability instead peaks in beta-stable isotopes of darmstadtium or copernicium in the vicinity of N = 184 (with half-lives of several hundred years), with flerovium at the upper limit of the stability region.

Evidence for Z=114 closed proton shell
While evidence for closed neutron shells can be deemed directly from the systematic variation of Qα values for ground-state to ground-state transitions, evidence for closed proton shells comes from (partial) spontaneous fission half-lives. Such data can sometimes be difficult to extract due to low production rates and weak SF branching. In the case of Z=114, evidence for the effect of this proposed closed shell comes from the comparison between the nuclei pairings 282Cn (TSF1/2 = 0.8 ms) and 286Fl (TSF1/2 = 130 ms), and 284Cn (TSF = 97 ms) and 288Fl (TSF > 800 ms). Further evidence would come from the measurement of partial SF half-lives of nuclei with Z > 114, such as 290Lv and 292Og (both N = 174 isotones). The extraction of Z = 114 effects is complicated by the presence of a dominating N = 184 effect in this region.

Difficulty of synthesis of 298Fl
The direct synthesis of the nucleus 298Fl by a fusion-evaporation pathway is impossible with current technology, as no combination of available projectiles and targets may be used to populate nuclei with enough neutrons to be within the island of stability, and radioactive beams (such as 44S) cannot be produced with sufficient intensities to make an experiment feasible.

It has been suggested that such a neutron-rich isotope can be formed by the quasifission (partial fusion followed by fission) of a massive nucleus. Such nuclei tend to fission with the formation of isotopes close to the closed shells Z = 20/N = 20 (40Ca), Z = 50/N = 82 (132Sn) or Z = 82/N = 126 (208Pb/209Bi). Recently, it has been shown that the multi-nucleon transfer reactions in collisions of actinide nuclei (such as uranium and curium) might be used to synthesize the neutron-rich superheavy nuclei located at the island of stability, especially if there are strong shell effects in the region of Z = 114. If this is indeed possible, one such reaction might be:

 +  →  +

References 

 Isotope masses from:

 Isotopic compositions and standard atomic masses from:

 Half-life, spin, and isomer data selected from the following sources.

 
Flerovium
Flerovium